Help Yourself is the debut album by soul-blues singer Peggy Scott-Adams released in 1997. The record peaked at No. 72 of Billboard 200, and it includes the hit single "Bill". Other hits include "I'll Take Care of You", "Slow Drag", "I'm Getting What I Want", and the title track.

Track listing

Personnel 
Jimmy Lewis - arranged by, background vocals, producer
Peggy Scott-Adams - vocals
Rich Cason - arranged by, engineer, keyboards

References

External links 

1997 debut albums
Peggy Scott-Adams albums